KJNK-LD, virtual and UHF digital channel 25, is a low-powered Telemundo-affiliated television station licensed to Minneapolis, Minnesota, United States and serving the Twin Cities television market. The station is owned by HC2 Holdings. KJNK-LD's transmitter is located at the IDS Center in downtown Minneapolis.

KJNK-LD also serves the Mankato market (via K28OH-D in nearby St. James through the local municipal-operated Cooperative TV (CTV) network of translators), as that area does not have a Telemundo affiliate of its own.

History 
The station began as K58BS upon signing on the air for the first time in 1984 as a local translator for the Trinity Broadcasting Network. It became K65GC in 1994 when it was moved to UHF channel 65. It returned to channel 58 and reverted to their first callsign in 1997 and again in 1998. The station was K65GV from 1997 to 1998.

They got their original K58BS callsign back in 1998 and it stayed with them until 2005, when the station moved to UHF channel 25 and became K25IA. Their digital counterpart, K25IA-D, signed on in 2009 in order for the station to upgrade to digital.

On April 13, 2012, TBN sold 36 of its translators, including K25IA-D, to Regal Media, Inc. Regal Media is headed by George Cooney, the CEO of the EUE/Screen Gems studios.

Following its acquisition by Regal Media, K25IA-D continued to carry all five TBN services. This ended in September 2013, when all TBN services were dropped in favor of Informed TV, a series of video lectures from Alan Roebke, a former Congressional candidate from Minnesota's 7th Congressional District. Informed TV's programming is also carried on a subchannel of K21GN-D, a Selective TV translator in Alexandria, where the organization's headquarters are located. This ended in mid-November 2013, when K25IA-D resumed carriage of TBN and its subchannels.

Regal Media sold K25IA-D to King Forward in 2014. On June 9, 2014, the station changed its call sign to the current KJNK-LD. The station became a Telemundo affiliate on November 23, 2014, with Sunrise, Florida-based company DTV America Corporation becoming the operator of the station. That same day, KJNK's second subchannel began featuring programming from Doctor TV, a new upstart healthy-lifestyle network featuring the latest in medical breakthroughs, fitness programs, and other healthy living programming, with some programming from The Worship Network being shown during parts of the overnight hours. In terms of Spanish-language programming, KJNK now competes with WUMN-LP, which is affiliated with Univision, one of Telemundo's main competitors.

On February 12, 2015, Comcast cable began carrying KJNK on Xfinity channel 100 and Xfinity Digital channel 624. Later that year, DrTV was replaced by the Sonlife Broadcasting Network on channel 25.2, with 25.3 carrying Hmong language programming for the local Hmong-American community. King Forward sold its stations, including KJNK-LD, to HC2 Holdings in 2017.

Technical information

Subchannels
The station's digital signal is multiplexed:

Translator

References

External links
Official website
AVS Forum thread on K25IA sound problem

 

Telemundo network affiliates
Cozi TV affiliates
LX (TV network) affiliates
GetTV affiliates
Low-power television stations in the United States
Television stations in Minneapolis–Saint Paul
Spanish-language television stations in Minnesota
Television channels and stations established in 1984
Innovate Corp.